Rebecca Williams may refer to:

Rebecca Williams (actress)
Rebecca Williams (cricketer), Welsh cricketer in 2011 Indoor Cricket World Cup
Rebecca Williams (sportscaster), see Netball Australia
Becky Williams, labor unionist
Rebecca Yancey Williams, inspiration for The Vanishing Virginian
Rebecca Chase Williams, mayor of Brookhaven, Georgia
Rebekah Williams, Nunavut legislator
Becky Williams (musician)